Dabas is a district in southern part of Pest County. Dabas is also the name of the town where the district seat is found. The district is located in the Central Hungary Statistical Region.

Geography 
Dabas District borders with Gyál District and Monor District to the north, Cegléd District to the east, Kecskemét District and Kunszentmiklós District (Bács-Kiskun County) to the south, Ráckeve District and Szigetszentmiklós District to the west. The number of the inhabited places in Dabas District is 11.

Municipalities 
The district has 3 towns, 2 large villages and 6 villages.
(ordered by population, as of 1 January 2013)

The bolded municipalities are cities, italics municipalities are large villages.

Demographics

In 2011, it had a population of 48,289 and the population density was 79/km².

Ethnicity
Besides the Hungarian majority, the main minorities are the Roma (approx. 2,100), German (1,400), Slovak (1,200) and Romanian (300).

Total population (2011 census): 48,289
Ethnic groups (2011 census): Identified themselves: 47,774 persons:
 Hungarians: 42,305 (88.55%)
 Gypsies: 2,103 (4.40%)
 Germans: 1,391 (2.91%)
 Slovaks: 1,219 (2.55%)
 Others and indefinable: 756 (1.58%)
Approx. 500 persons in Dabas District did not declare their ethnic group at the 2011 census.

Religion
Religious adherence in the county according to 2011 census:
 Catholic – 23,774 (Roman Catholic – 23,568; Greek Catholic – 203);
 Reformed – 4,579;
 Evangelical – 948;
 other religions – 715;
 Non-religious – 6,181;
 Atheism – 426;
 Undeclared – 11,668.

Gallery

See also
 List of cities and towns in Hungary

References

External links
 Postal codes of the Dabas District

Districts in Pest County